The Cashibo or Carapache are an indigenous people of Peru. They live near the Aguaytía, San Alejandro, and Súngaro Rivers. The Cashibo have three subgroups, that are the Cashiñon, Kakataibo, and Ruño peoples. They mainly live in five villages.

Language
Cashibo people speak the Cashibo-Cacataibo language, a Western Panoan language which is written in the Latin script and taught in primary schools.

History
When first approached by missionaries in 1757, the Cashibo killed one of them and forced the rest to flee. They maintained hostile relations with neighboring tribes. They joined Juan Santos Atahualpa in 1744 in the destruction of missions. In 1870, Shetebo and Conibo people raided the Cashibo.

Until the 20th century, Cashibo avoided outside contact. In 1930, they numbered 4,000 but their population was reduced by diseases. Simón Bolívar Odicio dominated the Cashibo from 1930 to 1940. Odicio was a Cashibo who had been kidnapped and raised by the Shipibo. He encouraged the tribe to open a road into their territory, which brought on non-native settlement and rapid acculturation, with devastating effects on the tribe.

In 1940, the Peru government offered the surviving Cashibos a reservation; however, they declined, wishing to remain in their own homeland.

Notes

External links
Cashibo art, National Museum of the American Indian

Indigenous peoples in Peru
Indigenous peoples of the Amazon